Jan Frederiksen (born 20 June 1982) is a former Danish footballer.

Club career
Frederiksen began his career at Lyngby Boldklub, where he made his Superliga debut during the 2000–01 season. In 2002, he moved to Feyenoord, but subsequently was loaned out to its satellite club Excelsior. After one year in Netherlands Frederiksen returned to Denmark and signed with FC Midtjylland. Then he played for Herfølge Boldklub, before moving to Randers FC. On 16 January 2009, he signed a three-year contract with Brøndby IF, and joined the club on a free transfer on 1 July. On 8 August 2012, Frederiksen moved to Polish Ekstraklasa side Wisła Kraków.

Ahead of the 2013 MLS season, Frederiksen was on trial with American soccer club, D.C. United, but he was eventually cut by the team.

International career
Frederiksen represented the country at youth level, playing for the Denmark under-19, under-20 and under-21 national teams.

References

External links
Guardian Football
Career statistics at Danmarks Radio 

1982 births
Living people
Danish men's footballers
Denmark under-21 international footballers
Lyngby Boldklub players
Feyenoord players
Excelsior Rotterdam players
FC Midtjylland players
Herfølge Boldklub players
Randers FC players
Brøndby IF players
Danish Superliga players
Wisła Kraków players
Danish expatriate men's footballers
Expatriate footballers in Poland
Danish expatriate sportspeople in Poland
Association football fullbacks
Footballers from Copenhagen